PJM may refer to:
PixelJunk Monsters, a PlayStation Network game for the PlayStation 3
Punjab Janata Morcha (Punjab Popular Front), a Sikh political party in the state of Punjab, India
Polish Sign Language ("Polski Język Migowy")
Puerto Jiménez Airport  in Puerto Jiménez, Costa Rica
PJM Interconnection, a regional transmission organization (RTO) in the eastern United States that operates one of the world's largest competitive wholesale electricity markets
Phase Jitter Modulation, an RFID interface standard
Pingat Jasa Malaysia, a Malaysian medal awarded to Commonwealth servicemen who served in Malaysia during the Malayan Emergency and the Malaysian-Indonesian Confrontation periods
Patrick Joseph McGovern (1937-2014), a businessman, publisher, and entrepreneur known for founding Computerworld magazine, and founder of the McGovern Institute for Brain Research at MIT
Park Jimin (Born 13 October 1995), South Korean singer and member of K-pop boy band BTS
PJM, a hardy hybrid involving Rhododendron carolinianum, named after P.J. Mezitt.